Stenoma capnobola is a moth in the family Depressariidae. It was described by Edward Meyrick in 1913. It is found in Suriname.

The wingspan is about 26 mm. The forewings are glossy pale fuscous with the costal edge whitish ochreous and with a small suffused rather dark purplish-fuscous spot towards the dorsum beyond the middle. The hindwings are grey.

References

Moths described in 1913
Stenoma